Alicilio Pinto Silva Junior (born May 15, 1977) is a former Brazilian football player.

Playing career
Junior joined Japanese J1 League club Kyoto Purple Sanga in 1998. He played as regular center back with Naoto Otake. However Purple Sanga was finished at the 13th place in J1 League and he left the club end of 1998 season.

Club statistics

References

External links

kyotosangadc

1977 births
Living people
Brazilian footballers
Brazilian expatriate footballers
J1 League players
Kyoto Sanga FC players
Expatriate footballers in Japan
Association football defenders